"Concerto" is the twenty-fourth episode of the third series of the 1960s cult British spy-fi television series The Avengers, starring Patrick Macnee and Honor Blackman. It was first broadcast by ABC on 7 March 1964. The episode was directed by Kim Mills and written by Terrance Dicks and Malcolm Hulke.

Plot
Steed and Cathy come to the rescue of a visiting Russian concert pianist who has a dead girl in his room.

Cast
 Patrick Macnee as John Steed
 Honor Blackman as Cathy Gale
 Nigel Stock as Zalenko 
 Sandor Elès as Stefan Veliko 
 Dorinda Stevens as Darleen Lomax 
 Bernard Brown as Peterson 
 Geoffrey Colville as Burns

References

External links

Episode overview on The Avengers Forever! website

The Avengers (season 3) episodes
1964 British television episodes